Rainville may refer to:

People
 Earl D. Rainville, mathematician, professor at the University of Michigan
 Joseph Hormisdas Rainville, a Canadian lawyer
 Henri-Benjamin Rainville, a Canadian lawyer, politician and Speaker of the Legislative Assembly
 Martha Rainville, a US general
 Michel Rainville, a Canadian Soldier

Places
 Rainville, Vosges
 Rainville, Suriname
 Rainville, Quebec, which merged into Farnham, Quebec in 2000

See also
 Rain (disambiguation)
 Raintown (disambiguation)
 Rain City (disambiguation)
 Rainberg (Austria)
 Rainvillers, France
 USS Renville